This is a list of lists by year of The New York Times fiction best sellers.

The New York Times Best Seller list was first published without fanfare on October 12, 1931. It consisted of five fiction and four nonfiction for the New York City region only.

The following month the list was expanded to eight cities, with a separate list for each city. By the early 1940s, fourteen cities were included. This list of lists only cover the New York list before 1942.

A national list was created April 9, 1942, in The New York Times Book Review (Sundays) as a supplement to the regular paper's city lists (Monday edition). The national list ranked by weighting how many times the book appeared in each city list.

A few years later, the city lists were eliminated leaving only the national rankings, which was compiled according to "reports from leading booksellers in 22 cities," a system which remains, although the specifics have changed.

By year
(links are to lists of the New York Times fiction best sellers of each year)

 1931 
 1932 
 1933 
 1934 
 1935 
 1936 
 1937 
 1938 
 1939  
 1940 
 1941 
 1942 
 1943 
 1944 
 1945 
 1946 
 1947 
 1948 
 1949 
 1950  
 1951 
 1952 
 1953 
 1954 
 1955 
 1956 
 1957 
 1958 
 1959 
 1960 
 1961 
 1962 
 1963 
 1964 
 1965 
 1966 
 1967 
 1968 
 1969 
 1970 
 1971 
 1972 
 1973 
 1974 
 1975 
 1976 
 1977 
 1978 
 1979  
 1980 
 1981 
 1982 
 1983 
 1984 
 1985 
 1986 
 1987 
 1988 
 1989 
 1990 
 1991 
 1992 
 1993 
 1994 
 1995 
 1996 
 1997 
 1998 
 1999  
 2000 
 2001 
 2002 
 2003 
 2004 
 2005 
 2006 
 2007 
 2008 
 2009 
 2010 
 2011 
 2012 
 2013 
 2014 
 2015 
 2016 
 2017 
 2018 
 2019 
 2020 
 2021 
 2022 
 2023

See also

 List of The New York Times nonfiction best sellers
 Books in the United States
Publishers Weekly lists of bestselling novels in the United States

References

Fiction books